Ptarmigan Lake may refer to:

Lakes

In Canada 
In Alberta:
Ptarmigan Lake (Alberta), an alpine lake at the foot of Ptarmigan Peak in Banff National Park
Ptarmigan Lake at 53° 32′ 13″ North  119° 36′ 29″ West
In British Columbia:
Ptarmigan Lake in Cassiar Land District at 56° 29′ 04″ North  130° 12′ 10″ West
Ptarmigan Lake in Coast Land District at 52° 16′ 59″ North  125° 54′ 00″ West
Ptarmigan Lake in Kootenay Land District at 50° 10′ 59″ North  115° 31′ 59″ West
Ptarmigan Lake in Range 5 Coast Land District at 54° 03′ 00″ North  130° 01′ 59″ West
Ptarmigan Lake (Manitoba), at 55° 06′ 38″ North 101° 03′ 51″ West
Ptarmigan Lake (Newfoundland and Labrador), at 53° 48′ 00″ North 62° 04′ 56″ West
Ptarmigan Lake (Northwest Territories), at 63° 36′ 00″ North 107° 26′ 03″ West
Ptarmigan Lake (Nunavut), at 76° 22′ 59″ North 92° 55′ 59″ West
Ptarmigan Lake (Ontario), in Cochrane District
Source for lakes in Canada: search on Atlas of Canada retrieved 2010-02-07.

In the United States 
Ptarmigan Lake (Glacier County, Montana) located in Glacier National Park, Montana

See also 
 Ptarmigan (disambiguation)